Rufunsa is a constituency of the National Assembly of Zambia. It covers the towns of Karoma, Mukunku, Rufunsa and Shingela in Rufunsa District of Lusaka Province.

List of MPs

References

Constituencies of the National Assembly of Zambia
1964 establishments in Zambia
Constituencies established in 1964